Meomyia sericans (black and grey true bee fly) is a large species of fly in the family Bombyliidae. A flying Australian insect with black and white hairs on the abdomen with a grey thorax. The probiscis is long and slender. Wings appear somewhat tinted. In October, they may be seeing flying low, then laying eggs in the earth, including walking tracks. Food plants include the tea trees in the genus Leptospermum.

References 

Bombyliidae
Insects described in 1850
Taxa named by Pierre-Justin-Marie Macquart